Gabriel "Biel" Company Vives (born 16 February 1992), is a Spanish footballer who plays for CD Manacor as a right back.

Club career

Mallorca
Born in Maria de la Salut, Majorca, Company studied at the University of the Balearic Islands, then  graduated from local RCD Mallorca's youth system, and made his senior debuts with the reserves in the 2010–11 season, in Segunda División B. On 11 January 2012 he made his professional debut, playing the entire second half of a 6–1 home routing over Real Sociedad, for the season's Copa del Rey.

Company made his Segunda División debut on 26 January 2014, replacing Pedro Bigas in a 2–2 draw at Real Murcia. On 17 July he signed a new one-year deal with the Balearic outfit, and appeared in 16 matches during the campaign.

On 6 July 2015 Company extended his contract until 2017, being definitely promoted to the main squad.

Later career
On 6 September 2017, Company moved abroad and signed for Cypriot club Pafos FC.

Following a trial in the Netherlands with ADO Den Haag, Company joined Romanian club FC Hermannstadt on 12 July 2018. On 19 June 2020, Company was released from the club after having his contract mutually terminated.

Company returned to his native island in September 2020, signing for Tercera División club CD Manacor.

Career statistics

References

External links
Mallorca official profile 

1992 births
Living people
Footballers from Mallorca
Spanish footballers
Association football defenders
Segunda División players
Segunda División B players
Tercera División players
RCD Mallorca B players
RCD Mallorca players
Cypriot First Division players
Pafos FC players
Liga I players
FC Hermannstadt players
Spanish expatriate footballers
Spanish expatriate sportspeople in Cyprus
Expatriate footballers in Cyprus
Spanish expatriate sportspeople in Romania
Expatriate footballers in Romania